Mękarzowice may refer to the following places in Poland:
Mękarzowice, Lower Silesian Voivodeship (south-west Poland)
Mękarzowice, Świętokrzyskie Voivodeship (south-central Poland)